Nim Lepcha (born 1 November 1989 Dzongu, Sikkim) is an Indian footballer who plays as a midfielder for United Sikkim F.C. in the I-League.

Career

United Sikkim
Lepcha made his debut for United Sikkim F.C. on 21 April 2013 during an I-League match against Sporting Clube de Goa at the Paljor Stadium in Gangtok, Sikkim in which he was in Starting 11; United Sikkim lost the match 0–3.

Career statistics

Club

References

Indian footballers
1989 births
Living people
People from Mangan district
Footballers from Sikkim
I-League players
United Sikkim F.C. players
Association football midfielders